The Sjöormen class (Sea serpent) was a class of submarines built for the Swedish Navy in the late 1960s. At the time of their deployment they were regarded as one of the most advanced non-nuclear submarine-classes in the world, incorporating many new features including x-rudder and anechoic tiles. Both speed and underwater endurance was at this time very high for a conventional submarine. The submarines were retired by Sweden in the early 1990s. In the late 1990s, four submarines were acquired by the Republic of Singapore Navy (RSN) and relaunched as the  following modernisation and tropicalisation.

Description
As built, the Sjöormen class were designed with a teardrop hull shape, based on the United States' . They had bow planes on the sail and their stern diving planes were configured in a x-shape. The Sjöormen class was powered by a diesel-electric propulsion system composed of two Pielstick diesel engines providing power to an ASEA electric motor driving one shaft with a five-bladed propeller.

As built the Sjöormen class were equipped with surface search radar and sonar. The submarines were armed with four  torpedo tubes located in the bow for surface attack and two  torpedo tubes in the stern for either anti-submarine warfare or for naval mines. The Sjöormen class had a complement of 23 officers and enlisted.

Swedish upgrades
In 1984–85, the Sjöormen class received upgraded Ericsson IBS-A17 fire control system and CSU-83 sonar suite. In 1992, refits began on Sjölejonet and Sjöhunden that improved their electronics and their towed sonar array.

Ships

Service history
The Sjöormen class were ordered by the Swedish Navy in 1961. The first boat in the class, Sjöormen, entered service in 1968. In 1992, two vessels in the class, Sjölejonet and Sjöhunden, underwent modernisation. The remaining three were supposed to remain in service until the  became operational, but due to lack of funding, all were laid up in 1993.

Four submarines were sold to the Republic of Singapore Navy (RSN) in the 1990s and entered service as the  following modernisation and tropicalisation.

References

Notes

Citations

Bibliography

External links
Official Kockums website on the Challenger class submarines
Covert Shores

 
Submarine classes
Nuclear weapons programme of Sweden